Thom de Boer (born 24 December 1991) is an Olympic Dutch swimmer.

On 3 December 2020, he qualified himself at the Rotterdam Qualification Meet 2020 with a new Dutch record of 21.71 on the 50 metres freestyle for the 2020 Summer Olympics

Personal bests

References

External links
 

1991 births
Living people
Sportspeople from Alkmaar
Dutch male freestyle swimmers
Swimmers at the 2020 Summer Olympics
Olympic swimmers of the Netherlands
Medalists at the FINA World Swimming Championships (25 m)
20th-century Dutch people
21st-century Dutch people